Monmouth Medical Center, in Long Branch, Monmouth County, New Jersey, is one of New Jersey's largest community academic medical centers and is an academic affiliate of Robert Wood Johnson Medical School of Rutgers University, and is a part of the larger RWJBarnabas Health System.  Connected to MMC is the Unterberg Children's Hospital which serves the pediatric population aged 0–21 of Monmouth County.

History 
Monmouth Medical Center is a not-for-profit, 527-bed, regional tertiary care teaching hospital located in Long Branch, New Jersey.  Monmouth's service area includes a population of nearly 1 million year-round residents in Monmouth, and portions of Ocean and Middlesex counties, as well as a large population of tourists. Admissions total more than 19,000 annually, and emergency visits total nearly 43,000 a year. Annual outpatient clinic visits top 126,000.

Accreditation and awards 
Monmouth Medical Center is accredited with commendation by the Joint Commission on Accreditation of Healthcare Organizations (JCAHO) and is a member of the Council of Teaching Hospitals of the Association of American Medical Colleges. The Dental medicine residency is accredited by the American Dental Association. All other residencies are accredited by the Accreditation Council on Graduate Medical Education (ACGME).

The hospital was recently recognized as a Distinguished Academic Medical Center among an elite group of the nation's nine leading teaching hospitals, by Press Ganey. Additionally, Monmouth Medical Center had recently earned a ranking on Solucient 100 Top Hospitals – Performance Improvement Leaders award, recognizing Monmouth Medical Center for its clinical outcomes and patient safety.  In 2006, the Department of Radiology received recognition in the publication Medical Imaging as a runner-up for "Best Freestanding Imaging Center or Group".

Unterberg Children's Hospital 

The Unterberg Children's Hospital at Monmouth Medical Center is a pediatric acute care hospital. The hospital has 70 beds. It is affiliated with Rutgers University Robert Wood Johnson Medical School and is a member of RWJBarnabas Health. The hospital provides comprehensive pediatric specialties and subspecialties to pediatric patients aged 0–21 throughout Coastal New Jersey.

Education 
In 1945, Monmouth established its first residency program – in orthopedics – to meet the needs of physicians returning from World War II trained in treating battlefield trauma.

Half of the residents enter practice after graduation, while the others enter some of the most competitive fellowships in the United States. Today Monmouth has 110 residents in nine accredited residency programs.

Monmouth University Medical Scholars 
This program allows incoming Freshman of Monmouth University a track directly tailored toward Medical School. Students are pre-selected, enter a rigorous Pre-medical, undergraduate course of study and are guided by way of special advisors and preceptors at Monmouth Medical Center.  If successfully completing the program with desired GPA and MCAT scores, they are ensured acceptance at Drexel University College of Medicine.

Graduate medical education 
 Dental Medicine Residency;
 Diagnostic Radiology Residency;
 General Surgery Residency;
 Internal Medicine Residency;
 Obstetrics and Gynecology Residency;
 Orthopedic Surgery Residency;
 Pathology Residency;
 Pediatric Medicine Residency;
 Podiatric Medicine Residency.

The campus 
These include apartments for resident physicians, a privately operated day care center, Ronald McDonald House, and a professional and educational building.

The Altschul Medical Library 
Located within the hospital, this collection serves as the major information resource for the faculty, residents and students in the Department of Medical Education and staff of Monmouth Medical Center. The Library houses 4000 monographs, 7000 reels of microfilm, 2000 bound volumes, and subscribes to 300 journals.

The Library is a member of the Central Jersey Regional Library Cooperative and National Network of Libraries of Medicine. It participates in the National Library of Medicine Docline and has interlibrary loan arrangements with 100+ hospitals and universities throughout New Jersey.

Monmouth Medical Center Foundation 
This organization, started in 1982, is a volunteer group that fundraises through various functions to help provide charitable care to the community it serves.

References 

Organizations based in New Jersey
Education in New Jersey
Hospitals in Monmouth County, New Jersey
Hospitals in New Jersey
Long Branch, New Jersey
Children's hospitals in New Jersey